Per Høst (5 December 1907 – 28 December 1971) was a Norwegian zoologist, film producer and non-fiction writer.

Personal life
Høst was born in Kristiania as a son of Hans Andreas Høst (1874–1944) and fish food producer Ragna Julie Pedersen Svenneby (1872–1959), and was a brother of Haakon Høst. He grew up at Stabekk, finished his secondary education at Stabekk Upper Secondary School in 1927 and studied science from 1927 to 1931. He was married to Rita Thornborg from 1941 to 1948, then Ann Mari Strugstad Rolf from 1951 to 1960. The latter was a daughter of the late entertainer Ernst Rolf.

Career
His first short film was Hva turister aldri ser from 1934, about the Arctic fox. His first large success was the 1950 film Gjensyn med jungelfolket, about the Chocó people in Panama. Among his later films are Galapagos from 1955 and Same-Jakki from 1957. He produced television documentaries for both the British Broadcasting Corporation and the Norwegian Broadcasting Corporation. Among his books are Hva verden viste meg from 1952  and The Laplanders from 1964.

References

1907 births
1971 deaths
Writers from Oslo
People from Bærum
20th-century Norwegian zoologists
Norwegian film producers
Norwegian documentary filmmakers
Norwegian people of World War II
Norwegian non-fiction writers
BBC television producers
NRK people
20th-century Norwegian writers
20th-century non-fiction writers